Patriarch Cosmas may refer to:

 Cosmas I of Alexandria, Greek Patriarch of Alexandria in 727–768
 Cosmas I of Constantinople, Ecumenical  Patriarch in 1075–1081
 Cosmas II of Constantinople, Ecumenical  Patriarch in 1146–1147
 Cosmas II of Alexandria, Greek Patriarch of Alexandria in 1723–1736
 Cosmas III of Constantinople, Ecumenical Patriarch in 1714–1716
 Cosmas III of Alexandria, Greek Patriarch of Alexandria in 1737–1746